Freya was an early warning radar deployed by Germany during World War II; it was named after the Norse goddess Freyja. During the war, over a thousand stations were built. A naval version operating on a slightly different wavelength was also developed as the Seetakt.

Development
First tests of what would become the "Freya" were conducted in early 1937, with initial delivery of an operational radar to the Kriegsmarine in 1938 by the GEMA company. Freya supported an early version of Identification friend or foe (IFF). Aircraft equipped with the FuG 25a "Erstling" IFF system could be successfully queried across ranges of over 100 km.

The "AN" version gained a switchable phasing line for the antenna. Switching in the phasing line led to a phase displacement of the antenna's radiation pattern and with that, a squinting to the left or right. This enabled the system in effect to switch from the rather broad "scanning for maxima" to narrow lobe switching. In that mode, a skilled operator could achieve an angular resolution of 0.1°.

The Freya radar was more advanced than its British counterpart, Chain Home. Freya operated on a  wavelength (250 MHz) while Chain Home used 12 m. This allowed Freya to use a much smaller antenna system, one that was easier to rotate, move and position. It also offered higher resolution, allowing it to detect smaller targets. Because of its complex design, only eight Freya stations were operational when the war started, resulting in large gaps between the covered areas. The British Chain Home radar, although less advanced and more prone to errors, was simpler, which meant that the complete Chain Home network was in place in time for the Battle of Britain.

Variants 
 FuMG 450 Freya AN, initially called FuMG 41G (range increased to 120 km)
 FuMG Freya LZ (could be disassembled for airlift)
 FuMG 480
 FuMG 44 "Drehfreya" (German: "rotating Freya"), transitional model to FuMG 44/404 (navy: FuMO371), "Jagdschloss" PPI radar
 FuMG 451 "Freiburg", 162–200 MHz
 FuMG 321-328 (German naval designation)

Deployment and operation
Freya was often used in concert with the primary German gun laying radar, Würzburg Riese ("Würzburg Giant"); the Freya finding targets at long distances and then "handing them over" to the shorter-ranged Würzburgs for tracking.

It had a maximum range of only , making it inferior to Chain Home. Furthermore, it could not accurately determine altitude, but it was a fully steerable and semi-mobile system.

Freya was first successfully used on December 18, 1939 when two stations detected an approaching daytime raid on Wilhelmshaven by 22 RAF Vickers Wellington bombers at a range of 113 km and guided fighter planes toward them via radio. Only half of the Wellingtons returned to Britain undamaged, but the German fighters only reached the bomber after they had made their bombing run on ships in harbour. The performance of Freya left the Luftwaffe so impressed that, by the Spring of 1940, eleven Freya stations were installed to guard Germany's western border. After the invasion of France in 1940, additional Freya stations were built along the Atlantic coast. When Britain started its bombing raids, Hermann Göring ordered Colonel (later General) Josef Kammhuber to install an efficient air defence. This led to the so-called Kammhuber Line into which more Freya stations were incorporated. In the later course of the war, Freya devices turned out to be vulnerable to chaff, along with other countermeasures, which meant they could still be used for early warning, but no longer for guiding fighter planes. British bombing raids could also be organized such that the Kammhuber Line could be overwhelmed in massed raids.

British intelligence 
One of the first to give British intelligence any details about the Freya Radar was a young Danish Flight Lieutenant, Thomas Sneum, who, at great risk to his life, photographed radar installations on the Danish island of Fanø in 1941. He brought the negatives to Britain in a dramatic flight which is fictionalized in Ken Follett's novel Hornet Flight. Sneum's deed is also mentioned in R. V. Jones's Most Secret War as a 'most gallant exploit' and is one of the featured stories in Courage & Defiance by Deborah Hopkinson.

Further development 

 FuMG 401: For experiments with beam reflection on the ground, leading to a change in elevation angle, a Freya antenna array was installed on a wooden support so it could slide up and down. This enabled Freya to detect the target's altitude without the aid of other devices (such as Würzburg radars).
 FuMG 41: In an attempt to increase the range without changing the transmitter, several Freya antenna arrays were switched together. These installations, called "Wassermann" (German: Aquarius), not only had greater range but were also more accurate.

Countermeasures
To counter Freya, the British used equipment called 'Moonshine'. Carried by Boulton Paul Defiant aircraft of the Special Duties Flight (later No. 515 Squadron RAF), a single set retransmitted a portion of the Freya signal amplifying the apparent return. Eight planes with 'Moonshine' could mimic a force of 100 bombers. A second countermeasures system, "Mandrel" was a noise jammer carried by aircraft of No. 100 Group RAF which overwhelmed the signals from Freya. By using nine aeroplanes, a  gap could be knocked into the German's radar coverage, while further jammers were carried in the bomber stream to counter the inland Freya network.

Post-war use

One FuMG 80 Freya radar, after modification, was installed in 1957/8 at the Ondřejov Observatory in Czechoslovakia and served as meteorite tracking radar until 2006. Before then it was used at the Pardubice Airport, under name RZ III.

Notes

Bibliography
 Brew, Alex. The Defiant File. Tunbridge Wells, Kent, UK: Air-Britain (Historians), 1996. .
 Price, Alfred. Instruments of Darkness: The History of Electronic Warfare. St Albans, UK: Granada, 1979. .
 Swords, Sean S. Technical History of the Beginnings of Radar, London: IEE/Peter Peregrinus, 1986. .
 Fritz Trenkle: Die deutschen Funkführungsverfahren bis 1945, Dr. Alfred Hüthig Verlag, Heidelberg 1987, 
 Harry von Kroge: GEMA-Berlin – Geburtsstätte der deutschen aktiven Wasserschall- und Funkortungstechnik, 1998, 
 Helmut Bukowski: Radarkrieg und Nachtluftverteidigung, VDM Verlag, Zweibrücken 2007,

See also

Würzburg radar
List of World War II electronic warfare equipment
Operation Taxable
Operation Glimmer
Battle of the Beams

External links
 Deflating British Radar Myths of World War II  A comparison of contemporary British and German radar technologies and their use
 Das Jahrhundert des Radars von Dr. Wolfgang Holpp, EADS (PDF-Datei; 3,6 MB)
 Ehemalige Standorte von Radaranlagen

World War II German radars
Radar networks
Military equipment introduced in the 1930s